Sing is an American CGI-animated musical franchise created by Garth Jennings and produced by Illumination. It features the voice talents of Matthew McConaughey, Reese Witherspoon, Scarlett Johansson, Nick Kroll, Taron Egerton, and Tori Kelly among others. The first film, Sing, was released on December 21, 2016 and received positive reviews from critics. The second film, Sing 2, was released on December 22, 2021. The series has grossed $1 billion worldwide.

The franchise takes place in a world inhabited by talking, anthropomorphic animals. It follows a koala who, with the help of other animals, puts on live theater shows that largely encompass singing.

Films

Sing (2016)

In an attempt to save his theater, a koala named Buster Moon decides to hold a singing competition to get it out of debt.

Sing 2 (2021)

Buster Moon and his gang now have their sights set on debuting a new show at the Crystal Tower Theater in glamorous Redshore City. But without connections, he and his singers must convince the ruthless media mogul Jimmy Crystal and pitch the idea of casting the lion rock legend Clay Calloway in their show. Buster must embark on a quest to find the now-reclusive Clay and persuade him to return to the stage.

Short films

Gunter Babysits (2017)
Included as a mini-movie on Sing's home media release, the short focuses around Gunter who offers to watch over Rosita and Norman's piglets while they are away, but quickly finds himself way in over his head.

Love at First Sight (2017)
Included as a mini-movie on Sing's home media release, the short focuses around Miss Crawly who is set up on an online dating website by Johnny in which she attempts to find love.

Eddie's Life Coach (2017)
Included as a mini-movie on Sing's home media release, the short focuses around Eddie Noodleman, who partakes in a digital life-training seminar on behalf of his mother or else he will be kicked out.

For Gunter's Eyes Only (2022)
Included as a mini-movie on Sing 2's home media release, the short focuses around Johnny and Gunter who attend a hypnotist show in Redshore City where Gunter is hypnotized and believes he is a secret agent.

Animal Attraction (2022)
Included as a mini-movie on Sing 2's home media release, the short focuses around Darius who is filming a commercial while awaiting confirmation on an audition, but is consistently getting things wrong.

Theme park attraction 
Sing on Tour is an immersive musical stageshow attraction at Universal Studios Japan and Universal Studios Beijing. The attraction stars performers in mascot costumes of all of the major characters of the first film, and features the voice talents of the film's Japanese and Chinese audio dubs.

Construction on the Japan iteration of the attraction, in the new "Illumination Theater," began in September 2018, replacing Universal Studios Japan's long-defunct Monster Make-Up show. The attraction was announced mid-construction on December 5th, 2018, and then opened on April 18, 2019. The Beijing iteration was confirmed on October 20, 2020, and opened in the park's Minion Land on September 20, 2021.

Cast and crew

Cast
 A dark gray cell indicates the character did not appear in that installment.
 A  indicates an actor or actress was not credited for their role.
 A  indicates an actor or actress voiced a younger version of their character.

Crew

Reception

Box office performance

Critical and public response

References

American film series
Film series introduced in 2016
English-language films
Animated film series
Children's film series
Universal Pictures franchises
Illumination (company) franchises
Comedy franchises
Comedy film series
Musical film series